Herman Otto Hellwig (30 June 1875 – 5 August 1952) was an Australian rules footballer who played with Collingwood in the Victorian Football League (VFL).

Notes

External links 

Herman Hellwig's profile at Collingwood Forever

1875 births
1952 deaths
Australian rules footballers from Melbourne
Collingwood Football Club players
People from Northcote, Victoria